Qiz Castle may refer to:
 Qiz Castle, Jamkaran
 Qiz Castle, Khoy
 Qiz Castle, Osku
 Qiz Castle Daghi
 Qiz Castle Kondeskuh
 Qiz Castle Si